Geoffrey Robert Baker (born 30 July 1970) is a New Zealand former cricketer. He played first-class cricket for Otago and Wellington between the 1991/92 and 1994/95 seasons.

References

External links
 

1970 births
Living people
New Zealand cricketers
Otago cricketers
Wellington cricketers
Cricketers from Invercargill